Anotopterus nikparini is a species of fish in the family Anotopteridae, the daggertooths. It is native to the northern Pacific Ocean, where it occurs as far north as the Bering Sea and as far south as Japan and Baja California.

This fish can be found near the surface to depths below 2000 meters. Populations in colder regions are mainly larger, older adults.

This species feeds on molluscs, crustaceans, marine worms, salps, and fish. It is an important predator of Pacific salmon. In turn, it is a prey item for whales and large fish such as albacore, lancetfish, halibut, steelhead, pomfret, and blue shark.

References

Anotopteridae
Fish described in 1998